Max Lillie (1881 – September 15, 1913) was a Swedish born American pioneer aviator and flight instructor.

He went to an engineering university in his native country and served in the Swedish navy. He immigrated to the United States in 1904 and settled in St. Louis. In America he worked for an engineering and or construction company in St. Louis and in time formed his own construction company. In 1911 Lillie and Andrew Drew, a newspaper friend, got involved in aviation and formed an airplane company. They were joined by Walter Brookins, a former Wright Brothers pilot who taught Lillie to fly. Lillie soloed on October 23, 1911 and achieved ACA(Aero Club of America) certificate #73.

In the fall of 1911 Lillie gained total control of his airplane company venture and took his aircraft to the warmer climate of Atlanta, Georgia for the winter of 1911-12 returning to Chicago in the spring of 1912. Throughout the Spring and Summer of 1912 Lillie established his reputation as a flight instructor as well as a pilot carrying passengers and continuing exhibition flying. He completed Katherine Stinson's flight training on Wright Model B's after Wilbur Wright's death May 30, 1912. On September 14, 1912 he tried out for Expert Pilot License #1.

Lillie died in a plane crash September 15, 1913, in Galesburg, Illinois.

References

External links
CICERO FLYING FIELD by Carroll Gray
portraits of Max at the Cicero Filed (Carroll Gray collection)

1881 births
1913 deaths
American aviators
Victims of aviation accidents or incidents in 1913
Swedish emigrants to the United States